The Croatia women's national beach handball team is the national team of Croatia. It is governed by the Croatian Handball Federation and takes part in international beach handball competitions.

Results

World Championships

World Games

Medalist teams
2008 World Championships:
Filipa Ačkar, Marina Bazzeo, Snježana Botica, Dubravka Bukovina, Anja Daskijević, Ivana Lovrić, Maja Majer, Petra Starček, Vlatka Šamarinec, Željka Vidović.
Coach: Matea Brezić

Awards
 Topscorer of the tournament: Željka Vidović (2006 WC)

Abbreviations: WC − World Championship

See also
Croatia national beach handball team

References

External links
Official website
IHF profile

Beach handball
Women's national beach handball teams
Women's national sports teams of Croatia